Phoenicoprocta vacillans is a moth in the subfamily Arctiinae. It was described by Francis Walker in 1856. It is found in Colombia and the Brazilian states of São Paulo and Santa Catarina.

References

Moths described in 1856
Euchromiina